This is a list of tracks which have hosted a NASCAR Cup Series race from 1949 to present.

Current 

The following is a list of race tracks currently used by NASCAR as part of its NASCAR Cup Series for its 2021 season.

Key to table
 Track – The name of the facility.
 Miles – Length of the course.
 Configuration – Shape of the course.
 Location – Geographical location of the track.
 Seating – Number of seats for spectators at the track, if known.
 Races – Feature races for the top national series that race there.
 Lights – If the track has lights, the column will say yes, otherwise no.

See also 

 List of NASCAR Xfinity Series tracks
 List of NASCAR Camping World Truck Series tracks

References

NASCAR-related lists
Lists of motorsport venues
Lists of sports venues in the United States